The Bhubaneswar–Bolangir Intercity Superfast Express is a Superfast train belonging to East Coast Railway zone that runs between  and Bolangir in India. It hosts 12893/12894 train numbers daily.

Service
The 12893/Bhubaneswar–Bolangir Intercity Superfast Express averages speed 57 km/hr and covers 397 km in 6h 55m. The 12894/Bolangir–Bhubaneswar Superfast Express averages 55 km/hr and covers 397 km in 7h 10m.

Route and halts 
The important halts of the train are:

Coach composition
The train has standard ICF rakes with max speed of 110 kmph. The train consists of 17 coaches:

 3 AC Chair Car 
 3 Second Sitting
 9 General Unreserved
 2 Seating cum Luggage Rake

Traction
Both trains are hauled by a Visakhapatnam Loco Shed-based WAP-4 or WAP-7 electric locomotive end to end.

See also 
 Bhubaneswar railway station
 Balangir railway station

Notes

References

External links 
 12893/Bhubaneswar - Bolangir Superfast Express
 12894/Bolangir - Bhubaneswar Superfast Express

Transport in Bhubaneswar
Transport in Balangir
Express trains in India
Rail transport in Odisha
Intercity Express (Indian Railways) trains